HD 28700 (HR 1433) is a solitary star in the southern constellation Caelum. It has an apparent magnitude of 6.12, making it visible to the naked eye under ideal conditions.

HD 28700 has a stellar classification of K1 III, indicating that it is a red giant. It has three times the Sun's mass and has expanded to ten times its radius. HD 28700 has 120% the abundance of iron relative to the Sun. At a modeled age of 377 million years, HD 28700 is on the red giant branch fusing hydrogen in a shell around an inert helium core.

References 

Caeli, 5
028700
020934
1433
Durchmusterung objects
K-type giants
Caelum